Jean Hiscock (born 9 April 1939) is a British sprinter. She competed in the women's 200 metres at the 1960 Summer Olympics.

References

1939 births
Living people
Athletes (track and field) at the 1960 Summer Olympics
British female sprinters
Olympic athletes of Great Britain
Place of birth missing (living people)
Olympic female sprinters